Jerónimo de Cevallos (1560 - 22 July 1641) was a Spanish jurist. He was the subject of El Greco's Portrait of Jerónimo de Cevallos in 1613.

Life
Born in Escalona, Toledo, he studied at the University of Valladolid and the University of Salamanca. He worked as a lawyer in Toledo and in his birthplace. He married in Toledo, where he also later died.

He published five books, including Speculum practicarum et variarum quaestionum opinionum communium contra communes (1599). According to several sources he was a friend and protector of Jorge Manuel, El Greco's son.

References

Bibliography 
 
 

1560 births
1614 deaths
17th-century Spanish lawyers
University of Salamanca alumni
University of Valladolid alumni
16th-century Spanish lawyers